Bradsher is a surname. Notable people with the surname include:

Arthur Bradsher (1883–1951), American college baseball player and businessman
Keith Bradsher, American reporter

See also
Bradsher cycloaddition, a form of the Diels–Alder reaction
Brasher (surname)